Pelargonium grossularioides is a species of geranium known by the common names gooseberry geranium and coconut geranium. It is native to southern Africa and it is known in coastal California and parts of India as an introduced species. It is sometimes grown as a garden geranium. This is a glandular, aromatic perennial herb with an erect, angular, reddish stem 20 to 50 centimeters tall. The green to reddish leaves are a few centimeters long and slightly lobed with toothed edges. The inflorescence is an umbel of 3 to 50 flowers in shades of light pink to dark reddish purple. There are five narrow petals no more than 6 millimeters long.

References

External links
Jepson Manual Treatment
PlantZAfrica.com
CalPhotos gallery UC Berkeley

grossularioides